Eucalyptus wilcoxii, commonly known as Deua gum, is a species of mallee or tree that is endemic to south-eastern New South Wales. It has smooth bark, lance-shaped adult leaves, flower buds in groups of three, white flowers and cup-shaped or bell-shaped fruit.

Description
It has smooth grey, copper-coloured or greenish bark that is shed in long ribbons. Flowering has been observed in March and the flowers are white.

Taxonomy and naming
Eucalyptus wilcoxii was first formally described in 1987 by Douglas John Boland and David Arthur Kleinig in the journal Brunonia from specimens collected by Boland on the northern slope of Mother Woila Mountain in Deua National Park in 1982. The specific epithet (wilcoxii) honours Michael David Wilcox who made one of the first collections of this species.

Distribution and habitat
Deua gum grows in poor soil on steep scree slopes near the headwaters of the Tuross and Moruya Rivers in the Deua and Wadbilliga National Parks.

References

Myrtales of Australia
Flora of New South Wales
Trees of Australia
Mallees (habit)
Plants described in 1987